"Self Control" is a song by American rapper YoungBoy Never Broke Again, released on September 6, 2019, as the lead single from his  twelfth mixtape AI YoungBoy 2 (2019).

Composition
The song finds YoungBoy sing-rapping in a melodic flow and reflecting on his past struggles in life, including dealing with the losses of loved ones and temptations of substance abuse, and how they have shaped his present circumstances.

Music video
The music video was released on September 5, 2019. It opens up with NBA YoungBoy being released from prison and embracing family and friends; a reference to his release from East Baton Rouge Parish Prison in August 2019. He documents the private moments he spent with his family and girlfriend following his release.

Charts

Certifications

References

2019 singles
2019 songs
YoungBoy Never Broke Again songs
Songs written by YoungBoy Never Broke Again
Atlantic Records singles
Songs written by CashMoneyAP